Willard Long Thorp (1899–1992) was an economist and academic who served three US Presidents, Franklin D. Roosevelt, Harry S. Truman and Dwight D. Eisenhower as an advisor in both domestic and foreign affairs. He helped draft the Marshall Plan and was also prominent in business and education.

Biography
He was born on 24 May 1899 in Oswego, New York. He was raised in Chelsea, Massachusetts and Duluth, Minnesota.
He graduated Amherst College in 1920. In 1939 he was elected as a Fellow of the American Statistical Association.

He was Assistant Secretary of State under Truman for Economic Affairs 1946–1952; a member of the U.S. delegation serving as special adviser on economic matters at the Paris Peace Conference of 1946; special adviser on economic matters at the New York meeting of the Council of Foreign Ministers in 1946; and American representative to the United Nations General Assembly, 1947–48.

He came under great strain during the McCarthy 'witch-hunt' investigations into alleged Communists 1950–1954 and eventually resigned, becoming a professor at Amherst College again instead.In 1957, he served for a number of weeks as interim president of the college.

He died on 10 May 1992 in Pelham, Massachusetts.

Works
 Business Annals (New York: National Bureau of Economic Research, Inc., 1926)

References

External links
 
 Willard L. (AC 1920) and Clarice Brows Thorp Papers at the Amherst College Archives & Special Collections

1899 births
1992 deaths
Fellows of the American Statistical Association
Presidents of the American Statistical Association
American statisticians
20th-century American economists

Amherst College alumni
Amherst College faculty
Presidents of Amherst College